Smile Again is a 2006 South Korea television series starring Lee Dong-gun, Kim Hee-sun, Lee Jin-wook and Yoon Se-ah. It aired on SBS from May 17 to July 6, 2006 on Wednesdays and Thursdays at 21:55 for 16 episodes.

Plot
Ban Ha-jin is calculating and ambitious. Even though he's an orphan and a high school drop out, he will use any means to fulfill his ambition. Through coincidence, he meets Yoon Jae-myung at a bar in Switzerland. Jae-myung is a popular former baseball player who went to the same high school as he did, and Ha-jin manipulates a series of events to become Jae-myung's best friend. He also runs into Oh Dan-hee, the girl he loved and hurt in high school.

Despite her painful childhood, Dan-hee grew up to be a tenacious, optimistic go-getter who dreams of becoming a world-class professional softball player. Although tormented from the memory of being humiliated by her ex-boyfriend Ha-jin, Dan-hee makes a pact with herself to move on. Her sports hero is Yoon Jae-myung.

After Switzerland, the three again become part of each other's lives back in Korea. Ha-jin starts working in Jae-myung's father's company and does everything to make the rich chairman like him, shrewdly climbing the corporate ladder until he becomes the boss's right-hand man. Dan-hee, who also works for the same company, is a softball player on the company's league team. Jae-myung becomes the team's coach, and he falls in love with Dan-hee whose headstrong and optimistic personality attracts him. Jae-myung tries every possible way to win her heart, as Ha-jin becomes torn between his ambition and his love for Dan-hee.

Cast

Main cast
 Kim Hee-sun as Oh Dan-hee
 Lee Dong-gun as Ban Ha-jin
 Lee Jin-wook as Yoon Jae-myung
 Yoon Se-ah as Choi Yu-kang

Supporting cast
Kim Bo-yeon as Sara Jung / Jung Ye-boon
Im Chae-moo as Oh Joong-man
Hong Ji-young as Oh Yeon-gyo
Jo Hye-ryun as Kim Ok-joo
Lee Eun-hee as Hong Young-ah
Im Hyun-kyung as Park Chan-hee
Lee Young-jin as Jung Hyun-soo
Jo Dal-hwan as Ha-jin's friend
Heo Yi-jae
Park Yong-ki
Choi Beom-ho

Ratings 
In this table, The blue numbers represent the lowest ratings and the red numbers represent the highest ratings.

Reception 
The drama's rating is imperatively decreased at the middle of the series was due to a football season. However, it still manage to stay above 10%.

References

External links
 Smile Again official SBS website 
 
 

Seoul Broadcasting System television dramas
2006 South Korean television series debuts
2006 South Korean television series endings
Korean-language television shows
South Korean romance television series
Television series by Victory Contents